Derek Richardson may refer to:

Derek Richardson (actor) (born 1976), American actor
Derek Richardson (footballer) (born 1956), English footballer